The Ugly Beats is a garage rock band from Austin, Texas.

Born in 2003 from the remnants of Austin's Sir Finks, their first album Bring On The Beats! appeared in 2004, with a 1960s sound recalling pieces of the Kinks and the Who, as well elements of the Easybeats.

Their following albums continue the combination of the garage sounds with influences from the 60s. Diego RJ nicknamed them "the 60's Ramones".

Members
Current
 Bobby Trimble - Drums
 Daniel Wilcox - Guitar
 Jason Gentry - Bass guitar
 Jeanine Attaway - Keyboards, vocals
 Joe Emery - Guitar, vocals

Former
 Jake Garcia - Guitar
 Steve Austin - Drums

Discography

The Ugly Beats has released five albums and various singles:

Albums
 Bring On the Beats! (Get Hip Records GH-1126, 2004)
 Take a Stand with the Ugly Beats (Get Hip Records GH-1140, 2007)
 Motor! (Get Hip Records GH-1156, 2010)
 Brand New Day (Get Hip Records GH-1170, 2014)
 Stars Align (Get Hip Records GH-1185, 2019)

Singles
 "Can't Cut Through" / "Options by the Pound" (Get Hip Records GH-238, 2008)
 "Bee Line" / "Maximum Bumble" (Hillsdale Records, 2011)
 "Throw Me a Line" / "Sombras" (Hey Girl! Records HGR-500-12/11, 2011)

Compilations
 Shakin' in My Boots (Licorice Tree Records)

References

External links
 Official site
 Official Facebook page
 The Ugly Beats at Allmusic

Garage rock groups from Texas